Mamuka Jugeli, known as Ivane Jugheli (born 14 December 1969), is a former Georgian footballer, and currently is a football manager, scout and agent.

References
Player profile – ffu.org.ua
Player profile – klisf.info
Career stats – Liepājas Metalurgs

Footballers from Georgia (country)
Expatriate footballers from Georgia (country)
Expatriate footballers in Ukraine
Expatriate sportspeople from Georgia (country) in Ukraine
Expatriate footballers in Latvia
Expatriate footballers in Russia
MFC Mykolaiv players
FC Spartak Ivano-Frankivsk players
SC Tavriya Simferopol players
FC Temp Shepetivka players
FC Zorya Luhansk players
FK Liepājas Metalurgs players
Ukrainian Premier League players
Living people
1969 births
Association football forwards
FC Metallurg Lipetsk players